

Storms 
 Note:  indicates the name was retired after that usage in the respective basin.

 Obet (2022) – tropical depression that minimal affected the Philippines and Taiwan.

 Octave
 1983 – considered the worst tropical cyclone in the history of Arizona, whose remnants caused devastating and record-breaking flooding in the state.
 1989 – a Category 4 hurricane whose remnants brought notable rainfall to Southern California. 
 2001 – a category 1 hurricane, never threatened land.
 2013 – a powerful tropical storm that made landfall in Baja California in October 2013.
 2019 – never threatened land.

 Odalys (2020) – never threatened land.

Odessa
 1964 – never threatened land.  
 1982 – never threatened land.
 1985 – a category 2 typhoon that hit Japan.
 1988 – never threatened land.

 Odette
 1971 – a rare off-season tropical storm in the South-West Indian Ocean.
 1985 – formed off the coast of Queensland and moved across the Coral Sea.
 2003 – an off-season storm that formed near the coast of Panama and made landfall in the Dominican Republic.
 2007 – formed in the Coral Sea, causing heavy swell along the coast of Queensland.
 2013 – a Category 4-equivalent super typhoon that affected parts of the Philippines, Taiwan, and China.
 2017 – a category 2 typhoon that affected the northern part of the Philippines and later hit southern China.
 2021 (April) – formed off the coast of Western Australia and was soon fully absorbed into the circulation of Cyclone Seroja.
 2021 (September) – a weak short-lived storm that formed off the Mid-Atlantic U.S. coast and moved out to sea.
 2021 (December) – a powerful and catastrophic tropical cyclone that caused severe and widespread damage in the Southern Philippines, and the third Category 5-equivalent super typhoon recorded in the South China Sea, following Pamela in 1954 and Rammasun in 2014.

 Odile
 1984 – a Category 2 hurricane that made landfall northwest of Zihuatanejo and killed 21 people.
 1990 – a powerful Category 4 hurricane that did not threaten land.
 1994 – a powerful Category 3 tropical cyclone that did not threaten land.
 2008 – a tropical storm that affected Central America and Mexico.
 2014 – a devastating Category 4 hurricane that struck the Baja California Peninsula and also affected parts of Northwest Mexico and the Southwestern United States.

 Ogni (2006) – throughout Andhra Pradesh, Ogni killed 24 people, mostly on rice or shrimp farms damage totaled $47 million.

 Ofel
2004 – a weak tropical storm that hit eastern China.
 2008 – the most intense tropical cyclone in the Northwest Pacific Ocean during the 2000s, tied with Nida in 2009, and the most intense tropical cyclone worldwide in 2008.
2012 – a powerful, late-forming typhoon that devastated the Philippines with tropical storm strength, and battered Northern Vietnam with hurricane-force winds at landfall on October 28, 2012.
 2020 – tropical depression that affected the Philippines and Vietnam.

 Olaf
 1985 – never threatened land.
 1997 – an erratic and long-lived tropical cyclone that brought heavy rainfall to regions of Mexico, which would be devastated by Hurricane Pauline a week later.
 2003 – a minimal hurricane that made landfall in Mexico as a tropical storm.
 2005 – a powerful Category 5 cyclone that caused severe damage in both Samoa and American Samoa.
 2009 – approached Baja California.
 2015 – a Category 4 major hurricane that moved into the Central Pacific and then back into the Eastern Pacific while still tropical.
 2021 – a Category 2 Pacific hurricane that struck the Baja California Peninsula in September 2021. 

 Olga
 1948 – a strong tropical storm that formed in the South China Sea.
 1954 – a category 3 typhoon, never threatened land.
 1958 – never threatened land.
 1961 – Category 1 typhoon that hit southern China.
 1964 – formed and remained in the Gulf of Tonkin.
 1966 – a weak tropical storm that affected the Philippines.
 1970 – a powerful tropical cyclone affected Japan.
 1972 – struck the Marshall Islands and the Northern Marianas, causing minimal damage.
 1976 – affected the Philippines and Japan.
 1981 – a powerful tropical cyclone stayed at sea.
 1999 – killed 106 people in North and South Korea and caused US$657 million in damages.
 2000 – paralleled the Kimberley and Pilbara coasts.
 2001 – large Category 1 hurricane that had no effect on land. 
 2007 – off-season storm that killed 40 people, mostly in the Dominican Republic.
 2010 – crossed the lower Cape York Peninsula and then meandered in the southern Gulf of Carpentaria.
 2019 – formed in the Gulf of Mexico and became post-tropical shortly thereafter.

 Oli
 1993 – made landfall in Fiji.
 2010 – affected French Polynesia.

Olive
 1947 – 
 1952 – affected Wake Island.
 1956 – struck the Philippines.
 1960 – struck the Philippines and China.
 1963 – 
 1965 (March) – 
 1965 (August) – 
 1968 – 
 1971 – struck Japan.
 1974 – didn't affect land.
 1978 – struck the Philippines.

Olivia
1967 – struck Baja California.
1971 – continuation of Atlantic Hurricane Irene; hit Mexico.
1975 – caused heavy damage in Mazatlán.
1978 – continuation of Hurricane Greta; struck Mexico.
1982 – brought rain to California.
1994 – never threatened land.
1996 – a powerful tropical cyclone that passing over Barrow Island off the Western Australian northwest coast, and caused major landfall on the Pilbara coast, Pannawonica, and Mardie.
2000 – never threatened land.
2006 – never threatened land.
2012 – never threatened land.
2018 – made landfall in Hawaii as a tropical storm.

Oma 2019 – impacted Vanuatu, New Caledonia and the Solomon Islands

Omais
2004 – a weak storm that formed in May of 2004.
2010 – recurved out to sea as a tropical storm.
2016 – recurved out to sea, later threatening Alaska as an extratropical cyclone
2021 – A long-lived tropical cyclone which affected South Korea and the Mariana Islands.

Omar
1992 – a category 4 super typhoon in the Pacific Ocean, struck Guam, Taiwan, and China, causing 2 deaths and about half a billion dollars in damage. The name was retired after the 1992 season, and was replaced with Oscar for the 1995 season.
2008 – a category 4 hurricane that grazed the Netherlands Antilles, Puerto Rico, and the Virgin Islands, doing minor to moderate damage and causing 1 indirect death.
2020 – minimal tropical storm that caused rip currents and swells in the Carolinas, earliest fifteenth named storm on record in the Atlantic.

Ompong
2006 – wind shear from Typhoon Soulik prevented any intensification.
2014 – the most intense tropical cyclone worldwide in 2014, and struck Japan as a large tropical system. It also indirectly affected the Philippines and Taiwan.
2018 – a very powerful and catastrophic tropical cyclone that caused extensive damage in Guam, the Philippines and South China in September 2018.

Ondoy
 2001 – a weak storm that completed a loop to the east of Samar Island before moving further out to sea.
 2005 – made landfall in the northern Philippines.
 2009 – made landfall in the Philippines and causing massive flooding in Metro Manila and other nearby provinces.

Onil (2004) – was the first tropical cyclone to be named in the northern Indian Ocean.

Onyok
 2003 – hit near Hong Kong.
 2011 – 
 2015 – 
 2019 – 

Opal
 1945 – struck Japan
 1946 – struck the Philippines
 1955 – struck Japan
 1959 – 
 1962 – struck Taiwan, China, Korea and Japan.
 1964 – struck the Philippines
 1967 – 
 1970 – 
 1973 – 
 1976 – 
1995 – a Category 4 hurricane that caused severe and extensive damage along the northern Gulf Coast of the United States.
 1997 – struck Japan

Ophelia
1948 –
1953 – a Category 3 storm 
1958 – a Category 5 storm
1960 – a long-lived Category 4 storm in 1960 that devastated the atoll of Ulithi.
1986 –
1996 –
2005 – a slow-moving hurricane that battered the coast of North Carolina.
2008 –
2011 – a powerful Category 4 hurricane that affected Bermuda and Newfoundland (as a post-tropical storm).
2017 – a Category 3 hurricane that affected the Azores; after transitioning to an extratropical cyclone, it struck Ireland, Great Britain and Norway.

Oquira (2020) – a South Atlantic subtropical cyclone off the coast of Rio Grande do Sul

Ora
 1951 – approached the Philippines.
 1963 – 
 1966 – struck China.
 1968 – struck the Philippines.
 1972 – struck the Philippines and China.
 1975 – struck China.
 1978 – approached Taiwan.

Orla
 1961 – 
 1968 –

Orlene
1970 – hit eastern Oaxaca, Mexico.
1974 – continuation of Atlantic Hurricane Fifi that crossed into the Pacific.  
1986 – crossed into the Central Pacific a little over 21 hours after formation.
1992 – made landfall on the Big Island of Hawaii.
2016 – never threatened land.
 2022 – a powerful category 4 hurricane struck southern Sinaloa.

Orson (1989) – a Category 5 cyclone made landfall near Dampier.

Oscar
1983 –  one of the worst tropical cyclones to affect Fiji. 
1993 –
1995 – a powerful typhoon that affected Japan and killed 8 people and left many other people missing.
2004 –
2012 – a minimal tropical storm that formed in the open ocean.
2018 –  a Category 2 hurricane that did not affect land.

Otis
1981 –
1987 –
2005 –threatened the Baja California Peninsula, but turned away.
2017 – no threat to land.
  
Otto
1977 – made landfall near Bowen, Queensland storm caused minimal wind damage but caused extensive beach erosion.
1998 – struck China.
2004 – remained far from land.
2010 – brought heavy rain to the northeastern Caribbean before moving out into the Atlantic Ocean.
2016 – made landfall in Nicaragua as a Category 3 hurricane, bringing torrential rainfall to Central America; later emerged into the Eastern Pacific Ocean as a tropical storm and then dissipated.

 Owen
 1979 – a powerful category 3 typhoon made landfall near Osaka.
 1982 – a category 3 typhoon not affect.
 1986 – a weak tropical storm, did not make landfall.
 1989 – did not make landfall.
 1990 – a powerful Category 5 typhoon that crossed the Marshall Islands and the Caroline Islands in mid to late November and caused extensive damage to many islands.
 1994 – a powerful tropical storm struck the Philippines.
 2018 – long-lived and erratic cyclone that affected Queensland.

See also

Tropical cyclone
Tropical cyclone naming
European windstorm names
Atlantic hurricane season
List of Pacific hurricane seasons
South Atlantic tropical cyclone

References

General

 
 
 
 
 
 
 
 
 
 
 
 
 
 
 
 
 

 
 
 
 
 

O